The Lone Gun is a 1954 American Western film directed by Ray Nazarro and starring George Montgomery and Dorothy Malone.

It was originally known as Adios My Texas.

Plot
After he drifts into town with Fairweather, a card-playing partner, Cruze accepts a job as town marshal and takes on the corrupt Moran brothers, cattle rustlers who are cheating rancher Charlotte Downing and her brother Cass. Cruze had previously been a lawman in another town but when the townspeople turned its back on him and refused to help out in his hour of need, Cruze vowed to never wear another badge. The same thing seems to happen in his new job until he discovers that Fairweather is not a "fair weather friend".

Cast
 George Montgomery as Cruze
 Dorothy Malone as Charlotte Downing
 Frank Faylen as Fairweather
 Neville Brand as Tray Moran
 Skip Homeier as Cass Downing
 Douglas Kennedy as Gad Moran
 Douglas Fowley as Bartender
 Fay Roope as Mayor Booth
 Robert Wilke as Hort Moran

References

External links

1954 films
American Western (genre) films
1954 Western (genre) films
Films produced by Edward Small
1950s English-language films
United Artists films
Films directed by Ray Nazarro
1950s American films
Films with screenplays by Richard Schayer